The 2013 Norfolk State Spartans football team represented Norfolk State University in the 2013 NCAA Division I FCS football season. They were led by ninth-year head coach Pete Adrian and played their home games at William "Dick" Price Stadium. They were a member of the Mid-Eastern Athletic Conference (MEAC).

The Spartans came into the season having been picked to finish seventh in the MEAC. The Spartans also entered the season with five players having been picked for the MEAC Pre-Season All-Conference 1st Team and four players having been selected for the 2nd-team.

They finished the season 3–9, 3–5 in MEAC play to finish in a tie for eighth place.

Schedule

Source: Schedule

References

Norfolk State
Norfolk State Spartans football seasons
Norfolk State Spartans football